A hairpin or hair pin is a long device used to hold a person's hair in place. It may be used simply to secure long hair out of the way for convenience or as part of an elaborate hairstyle or coiffure.  The earliest evidence for dressing the hair may be seen in carved "Venus figurines" such as the Venus of Brassempouy and the Venus of Willendorf. The creation of different hairstyles, especially among women, seems to be common to all cultures and all periods and many past, and current, societies use hairpins.

Hairpins made of metal, ivory, bronze, carved wood, etc. were used in ancient Egypt. for securing decorated hairstyles. Such hairpins suggest, as graves show, that many were luxury objects among the Egyptians and later the Greeks, Etruscans, and Romans. Major success came in 1901 with the invention of the spiral hairpin by New Zealand inventor Ernest Godward. This was a predecessor of the hair clip.

The hairpin may be decorative and encrusted with jewels and ornaments, or it may be utilitarian, and designed to be almost invisible while holding a hairstyle in place. Some hairpins are a single straight pin, but modern versions are more likely to be constructed from different lengths of wire that are bent in half with a u-shaped end and a few kinks along the two opposite portions. The finished pin may vary from two to six inches in last length. The length of the wires enables placement in several designs of hairstyles to hold the nature in place. The kinks enable retaining the pin during normal movements.

A hairpin patent was issued to Kelly Chamandy in 1925.

Hairpins in Chinese culture

Hairpins (generally known as) are an important symbol in Chinese culture. In ancient China, hairpins were worn by men as well as women, and they were essential items for everyday hairstyling, mainly for securing and decorating a hair bun. Furthermore, hairpins worn by women could also represent their social status.

This ceremony marked the coming of age of young women. Particularly, before the age of fifteen, girls did not use hairpins as they wore their hair in braids, and they were considered as children. When they turned fifteen, they could be considered as young women after the ceremony, and they started to style their hair as buns secured and embellished by hairpins. This practice indicated that these young women could now enter into marriage. However, if a young woman had not been consented to marriage before age twenty, or she had not yet participated in a coming of age ceremony, she would attend a ceremony when she turned twenty.

In the 21st century hanfu movement, an attempt to revive the traditional Han Chinese coming-of-age ceremonies has been made, and the ideal age to attend the ceremony is twenty years old for all genders.

While hairpins can symbolize the transition from childhood to adulthood, they were closely connected to the concept of marriage as well. At the time of an engagement, the fiancée may take a hairpin from her hair and give it to her fiancé as a pledge: this can be seen as a reversal of the Western tradition, in which the future groom presents an engagement ring to his betrothed. After the wedding ceremony, the husband should put the hairpin back into his spouse's hair.

Hair has always carried many psychological, philosophical, romantic, and cultural meanings in Chinese culture. In Han culture, people call the union between two people , literally "tying hair". During the wedding ceremony, some Chinese couples exchange a lock of hair as a pledge, while others break a hairpin into two parts, and then, each of the betrothed take one part with them for keeping. If this couple were ever to get separated in the future, when they reunite, they can piece the two halves together, and the completed hairpin would serve as a proof of their identities as well as a symbol of their reunion.

Gallery

See also

Bobby pin
Hair stick
Hatpin
Hair clip

References

External links

Fasteners
Hairdressing
Types of jewellery